Rosetta Stone are an English gothic rock band formed in the 1980s by Porl King (guitar/vocals/keyboards) and Karl North (bass), plus their drum machine and synthesizer rack nicknamed "Madame Razor".

The band is named after the Rosetta Stone, an Egyptian historical artifact, and the band used much ancient mythological imagery, especially in their earlier work.

Their early style and first album reflected the jangly-guitar sounds of 1980s gothic rock, and their first big break came after live gigs supporting the then already well-established band The Mission. The band then moved to a more electronic sound before disbanding in 1998.

After time spent on different music projects, new Rosetta Stone material appeared in 2019 and 2020.

History
After playing live gigs around Liverpool and then nationally from 1988 onwards and releasing several independently produced singles to increasing popularity, Rosetta Stone recorded their first full-length album, An Eye for the Main Chance, releasing it in 1991. They also recruited Porl Young as a second guitarist and toured extensively to promote the album.

Following on from this, the band released their most successful single, the 12" Adrenaline.  Porl Young subsequently left the band to produce Children on Stun whilst Porl King and Karl North released a cover version of The Rattles' 1970 hit The Witch.

The band went on to sign a US record and distribution deal with Cleopatra Records who released much of their early cassette and vinyl singles and EPs in 1993 as an album under the title Foundation Stones, and a CD album Adrenaline which, along with the title track, also featuring earlier singles such as An Eye for the Main Chance and The Witch.  In the UK they released a CD album (on Minority One) entitled On The Side Of Angels,  compiling previous vinyl singles and their various remixes.

Using the advance money for 1995's The Tyranny of Inaction, Porl King purchased an Alesis ADAT multi-track digital recorder, the use of which substantially changed Rosetta Stone's sound. That album and most subsequent work featured a much more industrial/electronic sound, with extensive use of sampling.

Following an accident in late 1997, Porl King lost part of his left little finger, which changed his guitar style considerably.

The band split in 1998 after releasing Chemical Emissions and a radical remix of Tyranny as a limited release CD  gENDER cONFUSION and playing a final headlining live performance at the Whitby Gothic Weekend festival in October that year.  Karl North went on to join the already-established UK band, the Dream Disciples (their next album Asphyxia notably featuring Karl's Rosetta-sounding bass), and their subsequent live performances attracted much of Rosetta Stone's most ardent UK fanbase.

Porl King produced one more album (contractually) of 80s new romantic cover versions under the name Rosetta Stone for Cleopatra Records. He then went on to work on other projects. Rosetta Stone was presumed to have finished as a band.

In May 2019, Rosetta Stone, still consisting solely of Porl King, released a new album Seems Like Forever on Cleopatra Records, which included some new material plus songs previously released under Porl's Miserylab project re-recorded with more of Rosetta's signature guitar sound. The album was mixed by Jurgen Engler of Die Krupps. A video was released to promote the track "Tomorrow For Us".

A further full length album, Cryptology, was released in August 2020. Consisting completely of new material, it continued the social commentary of Seems Like Forever, tackling issues such as Brexit, racism and austerity in the UK.

Members' related works
Porl King wrote and produced his own music throughout the 2000s and early 2010s under the name Miserylab. King also operated as a remixer and producer, working for the likes of the Mercury Music Award -nominated Elbow and the Fluke side-project Syntax.

In the 2010s, King worked on the solo project In Death It Ends. The dark, foreboding nature of this project abandons prior interest in politics, and is connected with the witch house scene. Porl returned to release a new album under the Rosetta Stone name in 2019.

The Dream Disciples (Karl North) ceased to be active after their performance at Whitby Gothic Weekend in April 2004.

Young was resident DJ at Heaven in London. He is co-owner of the Tuff Twins label, and has produced and mixed several club tunes.

Fanbase
Rosetta Stone were one of the biggest names in the 1990s UK goth live circuit, due both to frequent and extensive early touring and to the successful independent promotion and sales of their records. Porl King was one of the few well-known goth musicians to contribute actively to online discussions with fans, for example on Usenet's uk.people.gothic newsgroup. 
Their dedication, successive tours and live appearances have gained them a solid fanbase - the most loyal followers became known as "Quarriers".

Discography

Studio albums
An Eye for the Main Chance (1991)
The Tyranny of Inaction (1995, revised later that year with normalisation) 
Chemical Emissions (1998, also includes new hidden bonus track "Plastic Toy")
Unerotica (2000, US-exclusive release with reformatted 80s audio and cover versions of New Romantic classics)
Seems Like Forever (2019, includes new material and reworked Miserylab tracks; streaming, MP3, CD and limited edition vinyl from Cleopatra Records)
Cryptology (2020)

Live albums
Under the Rose (1991, cassette only bootleg, re-released as a CDr in 1997)

Compilation albums
Adrenaline (1992, US-exclusive compilation of singles and remixes)
On the Side of Angels (1993, UK-exclusive compilation of singles)
Foundation Stones (1993, US-exclusive compilation of early material)
Epitome (1993 EP, compilation of "Adrenaline" and "The Witch" remixes)

Singles and EPs
Darkness and Light (1989)
Leave Me for Dead (1991)
An Eye for the Main Chance (1991)
Adrenaline (1991)
The Witch (1992)
Epitome E.P. (1993)
Nothing (1995)
Hiding in Waiting (1996, EP that is occasionally considered an album)
Tomorrow for Us (2019, released as single on streaming sites

Demos and fan club releases
Recreate and Emulate (1988, cassette only)
Whispers (1988, cassette only)
Chapter and Verse (1988, cassette only)
Retribution (1989, cassette only)
And How They Rejoice (1989, cassette only)
Gender Confusion (1998, CD, limited edition of 500, remixes from Tyranny of Inaction)

Tribute albums
Shout at the Remix: A Tribute to Mötley Crüe (Cleopatra Records, 2000) 
Don't Blow Your Cover: A Tribute to KMFDM (2000)
A Tribute to Tool (Cleopatra Records, 2002)
We Will Follow: A Tribute to U2 (Cleopatra Records, 1999)

Project albums
As Complicity (featuring members of Vendemmian, Altered States with production and keys/additional vocals from Rosetta Stone under the moniker wHATEver pRODUCTIONS)
Playing God (17 March 1997; CD album; UK, Grave News Limited - Catalog# FETISH 16)

References

External links
Facebook official Rosetta Stone band page
Rosetta Stone Twitter account
Rosetta Stone Instagram account
Rosetta Stone on Spotify
Rosetta Stone on Bandcamp
Under The Rosetta Stone on Myspace
Rosetta-Stone-Info.co.uk Rosetta Stone fan site - with discography, biography, lyrics database & image gallery
Rosetta Stone on Discogs
Porl Young on Facebook

English rock music groups
English post-punk music groups
English gothic rock groups
Cleopatra Records artists